Hossein Nuri (also spelled Hosein Noori or Hussein Nouri) (born 1 July 1954) is an Iranian painter, playwright and film director. One of Nuri's pre-eminent characteristics is that despite his physical limitations he has gained professional acclaim in three fields of painting, theater, and cinema.

Early life
Hossein Nuri was born on the first of July 1954 in Mashhad, Iran. He lost his father at the age of three and, despite all the difficulties, her mother raised him along with his brother who was a year older than him. He showed interest in painting at elementary school. After finishing elementary school in Mashhad, he gained a scholarship to continue studies at Farah Industrial School in Tehran.

Torture and disability
Farah Industrial School was deeply monitored by SAVAK, Iran's pre-revolution secret service. In 1972, Nuri wrote a play which was a political satire criticizing the system and defending the human rights. Minutes after the play was staged, it was interrupted by military forces present at the school. Nuri was tortured severely and after a series of harsh tortures, he lost the ability of moving hands and legs and his internal health started to deteriorate. He was sent to hospital as he was still under control. Finally as the result of fatal damages to Nuri's body, SAVAK reduced its control and he came back to his family who were then residing at Torbat-e Jam. Nuri continued painting by holding the brush with his mouth and uses a wheelchair.

Marriage
After the revolution, Nuri again decided to write plays and staged them in different cities. In a speech he made for the students of Sharif University of Technology, Nadia Maftouni, who was a student of Applied physics, fell in love with Nuri and proposed to him. Nuri accepted and she left her studies to live with Nuri in Torbat-e Jam. They have two sons; Abolfazl Nuri and Mahmoud Nuri. Later, they moved to Mashhad, and afterwards to Tehran.

Painting style
In 2004, Nuri introduced his new style of painting in an exhibition he held in Paris. It was based on the painter's intention to create a certain design out of an abstract process. The outcome was a combination of improvisation and calculated design. French painters suggested the name "Reflection" (Réflexion) for the style, which Nuri approved. Nuri does this process with materials such as oil-color and acrylic on large canvas and particularly the large scale of his works is one of his contributions to abstract painting. The use of bright colors and recurrence of butterflies are other characteristics of his style. Many of Nuri's works in the Reflection style are diptychs in which one side reflects the other.

Theatrical career

Nuri's theatrical career was revived after the revolution and it wasn't ever secondary to his painting career. In the 80s and 90s He wrote and staged several award-winning plays including The Purgatory Stop (1981), The Crimson Cloak (1982), The Last Festival (1983), The Circus (1985), Companion (1990), Beloved (1991), Intuition (1994), and The Seeker (1996). As an established character in Iranian theater history, a theater in city of Mashhad, which is one of Iran's theatrical poles, was named after him as Ustad Hossein Nuri Theater.

Television and cinema
Nuri directed several documentaries and television programs in the 80s and 90s. In early 2000s he directed some of his plays for television including The Last Festival, The Circus, Beloved, Intuition, and The Seeker. He was co-writer of the Saint Mary project of which a movie version was primarily released in theaters in 2000 and later the extended TV version was televised on multiple global networks and became a hit.

In 2019 Nuri wrote and directed the feature film My Arms Flew which was based on some actual events in his life. The film was screened and awarded in festivals and events in Iran, India, Germany, Italy, US, and Canada. After the screening of the film at Simon Fraser University of Canada, Patricia Gruben said: "I saw many things the second time that I had not understood on first viewing.  The way it works with narrative is fascinating.  I very much liked the visual construction of mise-en-abyme, where an image is inside another image, as with the dirt-bike footage and the cats in the window, and the paintings themselves. Also the dialectic between anger and spiritual beauty — the anger expressed in those violent paintings and suggested in the struggle to get off the floor, and in the brief cruelty of the cat against her kitten. And yet the ethereal beauty of the paintings, and of both Hossein and Nadia's faces, transcends that violence. It's really a wonderful film, and beautifully shot."

Tributes
Slavoj Žižek mentioned Nuri in the final part of an academic talk with Nadia Maftouni. As he was close to tears he said: "And incidentally, I know this will appear very low, but I mean it so sincerely... It made me cry when I read about this. Listen Nadia! Sincerely all the best to your husband."

Ian Linden, Professor of Religious Studies at SOAS who teaches on Christian-Muslim relations, recounts a story from his time in Tehran: "When there was a demonstration in front of the Danish Embassy in protest against the cartoons negatively caricaturing the Prophet Muhammad, an artist, who had lost the use of both arms, had managed while holding the paint brush in his teeth, to create a beautiful painting of Mary. He displayed the image and asked a question: This is our faith. What is yours?"

See also

 Persian Art
 Cinema of Iran
 List of Iranian artists
 List of Iranian film directors
 Islamic Art

References

1954 births
Living people
Iranian painters
Contemporary painters
People from Mashhad
Iranian theatre directors
Iranian contemporary artists
Iranian documentary filmmakers
Iranian film directors
Iranian screenwriters
People from Tehran
Persian-language film directors